Armistice of Malmö was a treaty signed on August 26, 1848 following the First Schleswig War between Denmark and Prussia. This treaty forced Prussia and the Frankfurt National Assembly to accept Danish demands of its annexation of the Duchy of Schleswig and temporarily maintained the balance between under the pressure from Britain, France and Russia.
Treaties of Prussia
Armistices
Treaties of Denmark
19th-century treaties